Gilberto Elsa (14 January 1938 – 2 June 1985) was an Italian swimmer who won a bronze medal in the 4×100 m medley relay at the 1958 European Aquatics Championships. He also competed at the 1960 Summer Olympics in the 100 m backstroke event, but did not reach the finals.

References

External links

1938 births
1985 deaths
Swimmers at the 1960 Summer Olympics
Italian male backstroke swimmers
Olympic swimmers of Italy
Sportspeople from Lecco
European Aquatics Championships medalists in swimming
Universiade medalists in swimming
Universiade gold medalists for Italy
Medalists at the 1959 Summer Universiade
20th-century Italian people